"Keep Givin' Me Your Love" is a song by American singer-songwriter CeCe Peniston, originally from her second studio album, Thought 'Ya Knew (1994). While in the US, it was issued as the fifth single release in 1995, in the UK the song was released as the second single in April 1994. After peaking at number 35 on the UK Singles Chart, it reached at number four on the US Billboard Hot Dance Music/Club Play chart in March 1995 and was Peniston's first song that failed to enter the Billboard Hot 100, stopping at number one on the Bubbling Under Hot 100 Singles chart. The song was also classified the Billboard Hot Dance Breakouts number one in the category of Maxi-Singles Sales on March 4 and the Billboard Hot Dance Breakouts number three for the category of Club Play Singles on January 21, 1995.

Critical reception
Jose F. Promis from AllMusic described "Keep Givin' Me Your Love" as an "agreeable" house track. Larry Flick from Billboard wrote, "Giddy with the youthful exuberance and romance that made "Finally" a classic, this bright pop/dance ditty could be the boost Peniston need to once again win the hearts of top 40 programmers." Pan-European magazine Music & Media commented, "The intro, with its simple piano chord on a dance beat, and the "false start" of the vocals–sort of stuttering she falls into the song–instantly give away who it is." Andy Beevers from Music Week gave it four out of five, declaring it as "another upbeat and catchy soulful house track that benefits greatly from some West End remixes. This should not have any trouble following "In The Mood" into the Top 40." A reviewer from People Magazine described it as a "thump-fest". The RM Dance Update deemed it "another happy 'hands in the air' handbag classic". An editor, James Hamilton, called it a "cheerful plonking canterer".

Credits and personnel
 CeCe Peniston – lead/back vocal, executive producer
 Steven Nikolas – writer, vocal arrangement
 Brendon Sibley – writer, vocal arrangement
 Carsten Schack – writer
 Kenneth Karlin – writer
 Cutfather – writer
 Norma Jean Wright – back vocal
 Bem Shi Jones – back vocal
 Katreese Barnes – back vocal
 David Morales – producer, mix/remix, arranger, percussion
 Eddie Gordon  – remix, additional producer
 Danny Madded – background conductor

 David Sussman – engineer
 Manny Lehman – executive producer
 Satoshi Tomiie – keyboard programming
 Alec Shantzis – programming
 Terry Burrus – programming
 Damon Jones – executive producer
 David Collins – mastering
 Patricia Sullivan – mastering
 Gabrielle Raumberger – art direction
 Dylan Tran – design
 Michael Lavine – photography
 Quad Studios, (New York City) – studio, mix
 A&M Mastering Studios, Los Angeles – mastering
 Steven and Brendon Songs/Casadida Publishing (ASCAP) – publisher
 EMI Virgin Music – publisher, admin

Track listings and formats

 VHS, UK, Promo, #()
 "Keep Givin' Me Your Love" (West End Radio Mix) - 3:46

 12", UK, #()
 "Keep Givin' Me Your Love" (Wild And Groovy Dub) - 6:03

 CD, MX, Promo, #PRCD 96331
 CD, US, Promo, #CSK 6732
 "Keep Givin' Me Your Love" (West End Remix) - 5:56

 CD, US, Promo, #CSK 6826
 "Keep Givin' Me Your Love" (West End Radio Edit) - 3:42

 7", UK, #580 548-7
 CS, UK, #580 548-4
 CD, DE, #580 548-2
 "Keep Givin' Me Your Love" (West End Radio Mix) - 3:46
 "Keep Givin' Me Your Love" (Album Edit) - 3:44

 CD, AT, #661473 1
 "Keep Givin' Me Your Love" (West End Radio Edit) - 3:42
 "Keep Givin' Me Your Love" (West End Remix) - 5:56

 CD, AT, #661473 2
 "Keep Givin' Me Your Love" (West End Radio Edit) - 3:42
 "Keep Givin' Me Your Love" (West End Remix) - 5:56
 "Keep Givin' Me Your Love" (Boss Mix) - 11:54

 12", EU, #COL 661473 6
 12", US, #44 77794
 "Keep Givin' Me Your Love" (David Morales Remix) - 7:03
 "Keep Givin' Me Your Love" (West End Remix) - 5:56
 "Keep Givin' Me Your Love" (Boss Mix) - 11:54
 "Keep Givin' Me Your Love" (West End Radio Edit) - 3:42

 12",, Promo, #CAS 6727
 MCD, AU, #661260 2
 "Keep Givin' Me Your Love" (David Morales Remix) - 7:03
 "Keep Givin' Me Your Love" (West End Remix) - 5:56
 "Keep Givin' Me Your Love" (Boss Mix) - 11:54
 "Keep Givin' Me Your Love" (Radio Remix) - 3:52

 12", UK, #580 549-1
 12", UK, Promo, #AMYDJ549
 "Keep Givin' Me Your Love" (West End Remix) - 5:56
 "Keep Givin' Me Your Love" (Album Version) - 6:16
 "Keep Givin' Me Your Love" (Wild And Groovy Dub) - 6:03
 "Keep Givin' Me Your Love" (2 Moody Dub) - 5:29

 MCD, EU, #580 581-2
 "Keep Givin' Me Your Love" (West End Radio Mix) - 3:46
 "Keep Givin' Me Your Love" (West End Remix) - 5:56
 "Keep Givin' Me Your Love" (Album Version) - 6:16
 "Keep Givin' Me Your Love" (Wild And Groovy Dub) - 6:03

 MCD, UK, #580 549-2
 "Keep Givin' Me Your Love" (West End Radio Mix) - 3:19
 "Keep Givin' Me Your Love" (West End Remix) - 5:56
 "Keep Givin' Me Your Love" (Album Version) - 6:16
 "Keep Givin' Me Your Love" (Wild And Groovy Dub) - 6:03
 "Keep Givin' Me Your Love" (2 Moody Dub) - 5:29

Charts

References

External links
 

1994 songs
1994 singles
1995 singles
CeCe Peniston songs
Songs written by Soulshock
Songs written by Cutfather
Songs written by Kenneth Karlin
A&M Records singles
Columbia Records singles